Otoba is a genus of trees in family Myristicaceae that ranges from Nicaragua to Bolivia.

Selected species
According to Tropicos and Plants of the World Online , the following nine species were accepted:

 O. acuminata  (Standl.) A.H.Gentry
 O. cyclobasis T.S. Jaram. & Balslev
 O. glycycarpa  (Ducke) W.A.Rodrigues & T.S.Jaram.
 O. gordoniifolia  (A.DC.) A.H.Gentry
 O. gracilipes  (A.C.Sm.) A.H.Gentry
 O. latialata  (Pittier) A.H.Gentry
 O. lehmannii  (A.C.Sm.) A.H.Gentry
 O. novogranatensis  Moldenke
 O. parvifolia  (Markgr.) A.H.Gentry

References

Myristicaceae
Myristicaceae genera
Taxonomy articles created by Polbot